Bittersweet White Light is the ninth studio album by American singer Cher. The album was released in April 1973 by MCA. It was the last solo Cher album to be produced by then-performing partner and husband Sonny Bono.  While many fans consider the album to be her best vocal performance, Bittersweet White Light, composed mostly of covers of American pop standards, was Cher's first commercial failure of the 1970s. It was Cher's first record released only by MCA, both in the UK and the US.

Production and release 
Due to the success of Cher's solo torch spots on The Sonny & Cher Comedy Hour like "My Funny Valentine" and "What a Difference a Day Makes", Bono decided she should record an album featuring modern arrangements of standards from the 1920s, 1930s and 1940s.

Bittersweet White Light was a collection of fully orchestrated, lushly-arranged classics. Bono had started in the music business working with "Wall of Sound" producer Phil Spector and the album clearly demonstrates Spector's influence.  Songs in the record range from Gershwin tunes "How Long Has This Been Going On?" and "The Man I Love" to Al Jolson's "Sonny Boy" to Judy Garland's "The Man That Got Away" to Duke Ellington's "I Got It Bad and That Ain't Good". The album was promoted on her successful The Sonny & Cher Comedy Hour show. The title of the album was reported to be taken from the staging of such songs on her television show—which she performed in front of a torch spotlight. Bittersweet White Light was also the first of Cher's album's to feature medleys, "Jolson Medley", and with track mixed, "How Long Has This Been Going On" with "The Man I Love" and "Why Was I Born" with "The Man That Got Away". The other albums that got tracks mixed together were Take Me Home and Prisoner.

Bittersweet White Light was re-released on CD in 1999 under the name Bittersweet: The Love Songs Collection along with selected ballads tracks from other Cher albums, including Cher, Half-Breed and Dark Lady.  The disc was compiled and co-produced by Mike Khouri.

Critical reception 

Bittersweet White Light received mixed reviews from music critics. Rolling Stone said about the album that it "consists entirely of ballad-rocked standards by Kern, Gershwin, etc., and should please the artist's TV fans."

Commercial performance
Bittersweet White Light was her first commercial failure of the 1970s. It charted only on the US Billboard 200 at 140. The album, unlike the previous release, did not enter the Canadian album chart, or any European charts. Due to the album's lack of success, only one single was released, "Am I Blue".
It missed the Billboard Hot 100 chart, peaking at 111 in Bubbling Under Hot 100 Singles.

Track listing

Personnel 
 Cher - lead vocals
 Sonny Bono - record producer
 Jeff Porcaro - drums
 Dean Parks, Don Peake - guitar
 David Hungate - bass guitar
 David Paich - keyboards
 Joe Sample - keyboards
 Michel Rubini - keyboards
Jimmy Dale - arrangements
Ted Dale - conductor
Albert Harris (tracks: A3, A5, B2, B3, B4), Gene Page (track: A2), John D'Andrea (track: A4), Michel Rubini (track: A1), Mundell Lowe - orchestra
 Lenny Roberts - sound engineer
 Bittersweet: The Love Songs Collection (re-issue 1999)
 Re-issue producers: Mike Khouri, Andy McKay
 Compiled by Mike Khouri

Charts

References 

Cher albums
1973 albums
Albums produced by Sonny Bono
MCA Records albums